One Day is the final studio album by the progressive bluegrass band Northern Lights. 5-string banjo is back in the group sound, as Mike Kropp returns as a guest player for this album.

Track listing
 Short Time Going (Emery) 3:21
 Fat Man in the Bathtub (George) 3:56
 Miss Molly (Walker) 2:24
 Moneghan's Jig (trad.) 4:09
 Working on a Building (trad.) 4:01
 Please Search your Heart (Goble, Lawson) 3:05
 One Day (Daniel) 3:31
 Sailing to Philadelphia (Knopfler) 3:55
 Waiting in Vain (Marley) 4.42
 Talk About Something (trad.) 3:50

Personnel
 Ben Demerath - guitar, vocals
 John Daniel - bass, vocals
 Bill Henry - vocals, guitar
 Joe Walsh - mandolin, vocals
 Mike Barnett - violin, vocals

with
 Mike Kropp - banjo

References

External links
Official site

2008 albums
Northern Lights (bluegrass band) albums